Praful Raval is a Gujarati teacher, poet, essayist and short story writer. Raval is a co-editor of Kavilok and Kumar and works as a general secretary of Gujarati Sahitya Parishad. He received Kumar Suvarna Chandrak in 1982.

Early life 
Raval was born on 5 September 1948 in Viramgam to Jagjivandas and Subhadraben.

Raval completed SSC from Sheth M. J High School, Viramgam. He completed his Bachelor of Arts from C. M Desai Arts and Commerce College, Viramgam in Gujarati and joined the School of Language, Gujarat University. He completed a Master of Arts, a Master of Philosophy and Ph.D.

Career 
Raval taught at L. C Kanya Vidyalaya, Viramgam from 1970 to 1983 and Sheth M. J High School, Viramgam from 1983 to 1984. 

In 1984, he founded Kruti Prakashan, a publishing company.

In 1992, he founded a primary school namely Shishu Niketan, later known as Setu Vidyalaya. In 1995, he founded another school, Sarjan Vidyamandir, and served there as principal until 2006. 

In 2012, he became co-editor of Kumar. He works as general secretary of Gujarati Sahitya Parishad.

Works

Poetry 

 Aavtikalni Shodh ma (2011) 
 Minoee Sachu Kaheti'ti (2014)

Biographical essays 

 Nokha-Anokha (1985) 
 Ba Etle (2001) 
 Manas Ae To Manas (2014)

Short stories 

 Pakelo Andhkar

Recognition 
He received  Kumar Suvarna Chandrak in 1982.

References

1948 births
Living people
Poets from Gujarat
Gujarati people
Gujarati-language writers
Indian male poets
Gujarati-language poets
20th-century Indian poets
Indian magazine editors
20th-century Indian male writers